Horace William Bozarth (July 29, 1894 – June 2, 1976) was an American politician in the state of Washington. He served in the Washington House of Representatives from 1961 to 1991.

References

1976 deaths
1894 births
People from Spokane County, Washington
Democratic Party members of the Washington House of Representatives
20th-century American politicians